Teng Min-chih is a Taiwanese politician. He was the Deputy Minister of the Public Construction Commission of the Executive Yuan until 20 May 2016.

Education
Teng received his bachelor's and master's degrees in law from National Chung Hsing University and Chinese Culture University, respectively.

Early career
He worked as clerk and specialist in the Ministry of Civil Service of the Examination Yuan; specialist, secretary-general of central district office, secretary, secretary-general and deputy director of Department of Rapid Transit Systems of Taipei City Government; and secretary-general of Taipei City Government.

References

Political office-holders in the Republic of China on Taiwan
Living people
Chinese Culture University alumni
National Chung Hsing University alumni
Year of birth missing (living people)